Herlihy Peak is an 11,758-foot-elevation (3,584 meter) mountain summit located in the Sierra Nevada mountain range in Mono County of northern California, United States. It is situated approximately four miles south of the community of Mammoth Lakes, in the John Muir Wilderness, on land managed by Inyo National Forest. Herlihy Peak is positioned midway between landmarks Crystal Crag and Bloody Mountain. Precipitation runoff from the peak drains to Mammoth Creek.

History
The first ascent of Herlihy Peak was made September 3, 1966, by Bob Herlihy, Andy Smatko, Bill Schuler, and Ellen Siegal. R. J. Secor named the peak in memory of Bob Herlihy, a Sierra Club member, who six years after making the first ascent, was killed by lightning on Mount Goode in July 1972. A memorial plaque and Bob's ashes are placed on the summit of Herlihy Peak. This mountain's toponym has not been officially adopted by the United States Board on Geographic Names, so it is not labelled on USGS maps, and will remain unofficial as long as the USGS policy of not adopting new toponyms in designated wilderness areas remains in effect.

Climate
Herlihy Peak is located in an alpine climate zone. Most weather fronts originate in the Pacific Ocean and travel east toward the Sierra Nevada mountains. As fronts approach, they are forced upward by the peaks (orographic lift), causing them to drop their moisture in the form of rain or snowfall onto the range.

See also
 List of mountain peaks of California

References

External links
 Photo of memorial plaque on Herlihy Peak
 Robert Herlihy: Sierra Club
 Bob Herlihy (photo): Flickr
 Bob Herlihy (photo): Flickr
 Bob Herlihy (photo): Flickr

Inyo National Forest
Mountains of Mono County, California
Mountains of the John Muir Wilderness
North American 3000 m summits
Mountains of Northern California
Sierra Nevada (United States)